Alborea may refer to:

 Alborea, a municipality in Albacete, Castile-La Mancha, Spain
 Alboreá, a Flamenco palo performed during Gypsy marriage ceremonies